Patriarch Basil may refer to:

 Basil I of Constantinople, Ecumenical Patriarch in 970–974
 Basil II of Constantinople, Ecumenical Patriarch in 1183–1186
 Basil I of Bulgaria, Patriarch of Bulgaria c. 1186 – c. 1232
 Basil II of Bulgaria, Patriarch of Bulgaria c. 1246–1263
 Basil III of Bulgaria, Patriarch of Bulgaria c. 1254–1263
 Vasilije, Serbian Patriarch in 1763–1765
 Basil III of Constantinople, Ecumenical Patriarch in 1925–1929